Csaba Szatmári (born 14 June 1994) is a Hungarian football defender who plays for NB II club Diósgyőr.

Career statistics

Club

External links
 Debrecen profile
 

1994 births
Sportspeople from Debrecen
Living people
People from Debrecen
Hungarian footballers
Association football defenders
Debreceni VSC players
Létavértes SC players
Balmazújvárosi FC players
Diósgyőri VTK players
Nemzeti Bajnokság I players
Nemzeti Bajnokság II players